Quadromalus colombiensis is a species of arachnid found in Colombia.

References

Arachnids of South America
Phytoseiidae
Spiders described in 1982